Johnathan Hankins (born March 30, 1992) is an American football defensive tackle for the Dallas Cowboys of the National Football League (NFL). He played college football at Ohio State, where he received All-American honors, and was drafted by the New York Giants in the second round of the 2013 NFL Draft. He also played a season with the Indianapolis Colts.

Early years
Hankins was born in Dearborn Heights, Michigan. He began his high school football career as a 255-pound offensive guard in his freshman year.  For his sophomore year he transferred to Southeastern High School, where he started on the defensive line.  Five-star prospect William Gholston transferred to Southeastern in 2008, creating the "best defense in Detroit", with Hankins shutting down the inside and Gholston patrolling on the edge.

Hankins was regarded as a three-star recruit by Rivals.com, and was listed as the No. 20 prospect from Michigan in the class of 2010. He intended to accompany Gholston to Michigan State, but did not get any offer from the Spartans.  Hankins eventually picked Ohio State over offers from Alabama, Florida, Michigan, Oklahoma, and Wisconsin.

College career
Hankins enrolled in Ohio State University, where he played for the Ohio State Buckeyes football team from 2010 to 2012.  As a true freshman, Hankins made the Buckeyes rotation and recorded 16 tackles (3 solo) plus a quarterback sack for the season.  He weighed in as a freshman "at about 350, 355," and was regarded as only a two-down player by defensive coordinator Jim Heacock.  By his sophomore year, Hankins managed to get his weight down to 330.  He became a starter, registering 67 tackles (32 solo) and three sacks.  Following his 2012 junior season, he was a first-team All-Big Ten Conference selection, and received first-team All-American honors from Scout.com.

Professional career
Even though Hankins only entered his junior season in 2012, he was projected to leave Ohio State early.  In preseason mock drafts from May 2012, Hankins was listed as a mid first-rounder for the 2013 NFL Draft. By mid-season, he had moved up to a top-10 spot. In December 2012, Hankins announced that he would forgo his final year of eligibility, entering the 2013 NFL Draft.

New York Giants
Hankins was drafted in the second round, 49th overall by the New York Giants in the 2013 NFL Draft.

After Linval Joseph left the Giants for the Minnesota Vikings, Hankins was expected to step into his role in 2014. Known as a run stuffer, Hankins surprisingly showed flashes as a pass rusher recording 7 sacks, 6 QB hits and 21 hurries. Hankins exceeded expectations as he recorded 51 tackles, 7 sacks and a forced fumble and was named to Pro Football Focus' AllPro Team at Defensive Tackle.

On November 8, 2015, Hankins tore his pectoral muscle during the second quarter of the week 9 game against the Tampa Bay Buccaneers. He was placed on season-ending injured reserve on November 10, 2015.

In the 2016 season, Hankins returned from his injury and recorded 3.0 sacks and 43 tackles. Hankins also made the playoffs for the first time in his career.

Indianapolis Colts
On April 13, 2017, Hankins signed a three-year, $30 million contract with the Indianapolis Colts. He started 15 games in 2017, recording 44 tackles and two sacks.

On March 17, 2018, Hankins was released by the Colts.

Oakland / Las Vegas Raiders
On September 13, 2018, Hankins signed with the Oakland Raiders. He played in 15 games with 14 starts, recording 36 combined tackles and 2 fumble recoveries.

On March 10, 2019, Hankins signed a two-year contract extension with the Raiders.

Hankins was placed on the reserve/COVID-19 list by the Raiders on November 18, 2020, and activated three days later.

On March 20, 2021, the Raiders re-signed Hankins to a one-year, $3.5 million contract.

Hankins re-signed with the Raiders on April 4, 2022.

Dallas Cowboys
On October 25, 2022, Hankins along with a 2024 seventh-round pick, was traded to the Dallas Cowboys in exchange for a 2023 sixth-round draft choice. He was placed on injured reserve on December 14. He was activated on January 16, 2023.

References

External links

Indianapolis Colts bio
New York Giants bio
Las Vegas Raiders bio
Ohio State Buckeyes bio
A Model and NFL Player's Stunning Garden-Inspired Wedding in Ohio

1992 births
Living people
Southeastern High School (Michigan) alumni
American football defensive tackles
Players of American football from Detroit
Ohio State Buckeyes football players
New York Giants players
Indianapolis Colts players
Las Vegas Raiders players
Oakland Raiders players
Dallas Cowboys players